Time to Love is a 1927 American silent comedy film directed by Frank Tuttle and starring Raymond Griffith, William Powell and Vera Voronina. It is currently considered a lost film.

Plot

Cast
 Raymond Griffith as Alfred Sava-Goiu  
 William Powell as Prince Alado  
 Vera Voronina as Countess Elvire  
 Josef Swickard as Elvire's father  
 Mario Carillo as Duellist #1  
 Pierre de Ramey as Duellist #2  
 Helen Giere as Elvire's guardian 
 Alfred Sabato as Hindu mystic  
 Oliver Eckhardt as Mayor

References

Bibliography
 Monaco, James. The Encyclopedia of Film. Perigee Books, 1991.

External links

1927 films
1927 comedy films
Silent American comedy films
Films directed by Frank Tuttle
American silent feature films
1920s English-language films
Paramount Pictures films
Films set in France
American black-and-white films
1927 lost films
Lost comedy films
1920s American films